James C. Ramos (born January 29, 1967) is an American politician who is currently in the California State Assembly. A Democrat, he represents the 40th Assembly District, which encompasses the San Bernardino County communities of Highland, Loma Linda, Redlands, and parts of Rancho Cucamonga and the city of San Bernardino. Prior to being elected to the State Assembly, he served on the San Bernardino County Board of Supervisors and as a Trustee on the San Bernardino Community College District Board of Trustees.

Ramos was first elected to the State Assembly in November 2018 after defeating Republican San Bernardino City Councilman Henry Gomez Nickel. Ramos is the first Native American and Native Californian to be elected to the State Assembly.

2018 California State Assembly election

2020 California State Assembly election

References

External links 
 
 Campaign website

21st-century American politicians
Democratic Party members of the California State Assembly
County supervisors in California
Native American state legislators
Native American people from California
People from San Bernardino County, California
1967 births
Living people